Lost Sense Recollected is lo-fi artist Elephant Micah's first official release. Released on LRRC, Micah's label, as a cassette-only release in August, 2001. The album is now available on Micah's website for purchase as mp3s.

Track listing

Side A
"Recognize An Impending Danger"
"Rides Away (Postscript)"
"Like This:"
"You Take My Sense With Longing" (demo)

Side B
"Sawed In Two"
"Holy Roadway"
"Put to Bed" (Live)

Elephant Micah albums
2001 albums